Don Preston (né Donald Jack Preston) is an American guitarist, singer, and songwriter whose career parallels the history of rock 'n' roll from the 1950s to the present. He notably recorded in the 1970s with Leon Russell on Leon Russell and the Shelter People and other albums, and with Joe Cocker on Mad Dogs and Englishmen (as "The Gentle Giant"). He backed Russell at George Harrison's Concert for Bangladesh in August 1971 and appeared in the documentary film and on the live album The Concert for Bangladesh.

Biography
Born in Denver, Colorado, Preston moved to Whittier, California, at age 8. He started playing guitar and sang in the Sewart-Barber Boys Choir as its youngest member. By age 11, he was performing with a youth troupe, the Cactus Kids, singing and playing guitar at store openings, company parties, and USO clubs throughout Southern California.

With trips to see live broadcasts of TV's Town Hall Party in nearby Compton, California, his musical style was taking root in country music as well as in the blues and rock 'n' roll as he became immersed in the diverse pop culture of Southern California during the 1950s.

1950s
Early influences included B.B. King, Lowell Fulson, Johnny “Guitar” Watson, and other emerging blues artists heard on late-night AM radio broadcasts. Within a few years, Preston would be playing the same bills with them as they headlined in the Los Angeles area. He had the opportunity to play his guitar with many other icons in clubs, halls, and historic L.A. venues like El Monte Legion Stadium, emcee’d by Art Laboe. As a member of the Legion's house band, The Masked Phantoms, and at Harmony Park, he backed hitmakers The Penguins, The Coasters, The Olympics, The Jaguars, Ritchie Valens, The Righteous Brothers, Gene Vincent, Don Julian and the Meadowlarks, and Jessie Hill, among others. Those early experiences resonate in his music, as does the influence of guitarists who have inspired him, including Merle Travis, Les Paul, Barney Kessel, Chet Atkins, B.B. King, Albert King, Freddie King, Tommy Crook, Joe Pass, Wes Montgomery, Jimmy Bryant, Billy Butler, and Wayne Bennett, to name a few. His first session date at age 16 was playing for Jim Balcom, with Earl Palmer, Plas Johnson, and Barney Kessel.

1960s
In the 1960s, Preston's band, Don and the Deacons, played at the popular Cinnamon Cinder, a Studio City club owned by Bob Eubanks. At that time, he also played in the band Cotton Candy that had evolved from another house band called The Vibrants. From there, he joined The Shindogs with Joey Cooper, Chuck Blackwell, and Delaney Bramlett, who had been regulars on the popular TV show Shindig!. In 1966, the group's harmonies produced a hit single, and they went on the road performing in several West Coast states.

In the late 50s to 60s, a number of talented musicians from Oklahoma migrated to Southern California to make their way in Hollywood's music business. Among them were artists such as Chuck Blackwell, JJ Cale, David Gates, Jim Karstein, Jim Keltner, and Leon Russell (Claude Russell Bridges), whom Preston first met in 1959 while standing in for Johnny (JJ) Cale on guitar with a SoCal bar band.

As has been noted, Los Angeles in the 1960s was a germinating ground for a new strain of blues/rock. During this era, Preston recorded two albums on A&M Records, both produced by Gordon Shryock. The first was Bluse (1968), and the second was Hot Air Through A Straw (1968) by Don Preston & The South with Bob Young, Casey Van Beek, and Bobby Cochran. He also recorded an album on Stax Records titled Still Rock (1969), as well as solo albums on Shelter Records. His songwriting also produced a song for Three Dog Night, “Circle For A Landing,” which was later used in the Ken Burn's documentary The Vietnam War.

1970s 
In 1970, Don Preston (as "The Gentle Giant") joined an all-star band to back Joe Cocker for a celebrated eight-week tour in March–May 1970. Known as Mad Dogs & Englishmen, the band was put together by Leon Russell (also starring) and Denny Cordell. Performances are preserved on film, DVD, CD/vinyl, and online as Mad Dogs & Englishmen.

After Mad Dogs, Preston began touring and recording with Leon Russell's band the Shelter People.  During that time, he contributed vocals and guitar to the album Leon Russell and the Shelter People, which included the song "Stranger In A Strange Land," co-written by Preston and Russell. 

As part of the Leon Russell and Friends ensemble, Preston also appeared in The Homewood Sessions, an unscripted and unrehearsed one-hour TV special on KCET (Los Angeles) that aired in December 1970 and was later rebroadcast on PBS (Public Broadcasting Service).

In 1971, a war for independence was escalating in Bangla Desh. Legendary sitarist and composer Ravi Shankar joined with Beatle George Harrison in response. Harrison organized the groundbreaking charity concert for hunger relief, The Concert for Bangladesh, attended by more than 40,000 at Madison Square Garden in New York City on August 1, 1971. Besides Harrison and Shankar, stars such as Bob Dylan, Eric Clapton, Leon Russell, Ringo Starr, Billy Preston, and others donated their time and talent. Don Preston sang and played guitar ('58 Gibson Explorer), backing Russell and other musicians on stage. That concert is also preserved on film, DVD, and CD/vinyl. 

Preston continued to play with Leon Russell's Los Angeles/Tulsa-based band on tour and recordings into 1973. 
During that time, he played on albums such as Carney and Leon Live.
Other work included playing guitar on three albums showcasing the influential Texas blues legend Freddie King, as well as later contributing to Russell's albums Stop All That Jazz and Will o' the Wisp.

By 1974, he was fronting his own southern blues/rock band playing across the country and also recording a solo album on Shelter Records, Been Here All the Time. By 1978, Ricky Nelson recruited Preston to tour with his Stone Canyon Band.

1980s–1990s 

During these years, Preston played numerous sessions, concerts, and gigs as a featured, side, and solo artist in the United States, Europe, and Asia, and produced an album, Sacre Blues (DJM Records 1997), which blends the blues with elements of country and rockabilly.

He showcased his versatility in the late 1990s, performing in the musical revue It Ain’t Nothin’ But the Blues, at the Crossroads Theater in New Brunswick, New Jersey. The show traced the history of "blues" music with more than three dozen songs. The theater company later moved to Montgomery, Alabama, for several weeks, after which, it took up residence for a year on Broadway in New York City (without Preston) where the musical received a Tony nomination.

2000s on 

Moving into the 21st century, Preston continued to play on sessions and freelance gigs. In 2002, he again went on tour, this time backing songwriter/guitar player JJ Cale and his band. By 2003, he came full circle, reuniting with his old friend Leon Russell for several U.S. concerts. That tour was followed by European tours with the blues/rock band Canned Heat in seven countries as well as in the United States in 2005.

In 2008, artist, bassist, and session musician Klaus Voormann (Beatles, Manfred Mann) asked many of the musicians he had played with to collaborate in recording his commemorative album A Sideman’s Journey, which retraced the footsteps of his musical biography from the 1960s on. Preston contributed guitar and vocals on two songs.

In 2013, Eric Clapton assembled a group of musicians and friends associated with JJ Cale to create a tribute album honoring him posthumously. Preston contributed guitar and vocals to the album, The Breeze: An Appreciation of JJ Cale, released in 2014.

In 2015, a film directed by Les Blank, A Poem Is a Naked Person, filmed in 1972–1974, was publicly released by his son Harrod Blank after Les Blank's death. The film is a documentary about musician Leon Russell and includes concert and rehearsal footage, some of which includes Preston, as well as material capturing the atmosphere of the times. A Los Angeles screening took place at the Ace Hotel in July 2015.

Personal life
Don Preston has been married to his wife, Cheryl, since 1987. He has one step-daughter (Shawna [Halsey] Guilfoyle) from his current marriage, and two sons (Craig Preston and Kevin Preston) from a previous marriage.

Discography

Albums 
 Hot Air Through a Straw (A&M 1968)
 Bluse (A&M 1968)
 Still Rock (Stax Enterprise 1969)
 Been Here All The Time (Shelter 1974)
 Sacre Blues (Rag Baby 1980; DJM 1998)

Singles 
 "City Lights" (A&M 1968)
 "Baby It's You"/"Something You've Got" (A&M 1968)
 “Keep On San Francisco”/“Free and Easy Day” (Shelter 1970)
 "What a Friend I Have in Georgia"/"Good Day, My Brother" (Shelter 1974)
 "A Minor Case of the Blues" (Shelter 1975)

Songs Recorded 
 “Circle for a Landing” (rec. by Three Dog Night; rec. and written by Don Preston) (TV doc: The Vietnam War)
 “Keep On San Francisco”/“Free and Easy Day” (rec. and written by Don Preston) 
 “Oh the Sunshine” (Viens Le Soleil) (rec. by Johnny Hallyday; co-written by Don Preston/J. Cooper)
 “Shades of Doubt” (rec. by The Paris Pilots; co-written by Don Preston/J. Cooper) 
 “Stranger in a Strange Land” (rec. by Leon Russell; co-written by Leon Russell/Don Preston) (TV: Graves, Cold Case; House; ABC World News) (Films: 29th Street; Wonderland; Eye of the Tiger) 
 “Acid Annapolis” (rec. by Leon Russell; co-written by Leon Russell/Don Preston)
 “I Found Love” (rec. and written by Don Preston) 
 “Do What You Want” (rec. and written by Don Preston) 
 “Read Me My Rights” (rec. and written by Don Preston) 
 “Looking For My Baby” (rec. and written by Don Preston) 
 “Skid Row Blues” (rec. and written by Don Preston) (Film: Everything Blues) 
 “The Heart I Broke Was Mine” (rec. and written by Don Preston)

Other Recordings 
Guitar or guitar/vocals on the following releases (partial list):
 The Big Blues Harmonica of Ben Benay (Ben Benay, Capitol 1963)
 "It's The Only Way To Fly" (Jewell Akens, Colgems 1965)
 "Andrea" (The Sunrays, Tower Records 1966)
 “Who Do You Think You Are?”/"Yes, I'm Going Home" (The Shindogs, Viva 1966)
 Joe Cocker and Mad Dogs and Englishmen (A&M 1970) 
 "Cry Me a River" (Joe Cocker, A&M 1970)
 "Space Captain" (Joe Cocker, A&M 1970)
 Leon Russell and The Shelter People (Shelter 1971) 
 The Concert for Bangladesh (Apple 1971) 
 "Bangla Desh"/“Deep Blue” (George Harrison, Apple 1971) 
 Getting Ready (Freddie King, Shelter 1971) 
 Carney (Leon Russell, Shelter 1972) 
 The Texas Cannonball (Freddie King, Shelter 1972) 
 I Can See Clearly Now (O'Neal Twins, Shelter 1972)
 Leon Live (Leon Russell, Shelter 1973) 
 Woman Across the River (Freddie King, Shelter 1973)
 Stop All That Jazz (Leon Russell, Shelter 1974)
 Will o' the Wisp (Leon Russell, Shelter 1975)
 Live at the Sweetwater Café (Jimmy Rabbitt, 1978)
 Closer to You (JJ Cale, Virgin 1994) 
 Leon Russell Retrospective (Leon Russell 1997)
 A Sideman's Journey (2011 Grammy nom.; Klaus Voormann et al., Universal 2008)
 The Best of Leon Russell (Leon Russell, Capitol/EMI 2011)
 The Breeze: An Appreciation of JJ Cale (Eric Clapton & Friends, Bushbranch/Surfdog 2014)

References

External links

Don Preston at Discogs

Living people
American rock guitarists
American male guitarists
Musicians from Denver
Canned Heat members
Guitarists from Colorado
1942 births